Bendito of Santa Cruz is an album by the Brazilian jazz saxophonist Ivo Perelman with the pianist Matthew Shipp, recorded in 1996 and released on Cadence Jazz Records. 
Most of the tunes are Brazilian folk songs arranged and adapted by Perelman.

Reception

In his review for AllMusic, Alex Henderson notes that "melody is a high priority on this session, and Perelman makes a point of stating recognizable melodies before venturing 'outside' for some very intense and explosive improvising."

Track listing
All compositions are Brazilian folk songs except where noted.
 "Bendito of Santa Cruz take 1" – 1:42 
 "Macumba" – 9:27
 "Anglo" (Ivo Perelman) – 7:22
 "Roses" – 6:41
 "Ze do Vale" – 5:39
 "Cego" – 4:43 
 "Cana Fita" – 4:17
 "Bandeirantes"  (Ivo Perelman) – 6:02
 "The Lion" (Ivo Perelman) – 3:08
 "Bendito of Santa Cruz take 2" – 1:38

Personnel
Ivo Perelman – tenor sax
Matthew Shipp – piano

References

1997 albums
Ivo Perelman albums
Cadence Jazz Records albums